Akpınar is a village in Kumlu district of Hatay Province, Turkey. The population was 1383.  as of 2012.

References

Villages in Hatay Province
Kumlu District